Full Circle is the first remixed album by Australian rock/synthpop band Icehouse released in December 1994 on Massive Records. It also features a variety of musicians including the Bangarra Dance Company, Elcho Island and guitar virtuoso, Buckethead who would later join Guns N' Roses.

Disc 1 is subtitled The Revolution Mixes and disc 2 is The Time & Motion Mixes; tracks "Shakin' the Cage", "MLK" and "Dedicated to Glam" as well as an edited version of "The Great Southern Mix" had been released in June 1993 on the Spin One EP. "Desdemona" is a cover version of the John's Children single, composed by Marc Bolan.

Track listing

Disc 1: The Revolution Mixes
"Shakin' the Cage" (Techno)
"Colours"
"Desdemona"
"Mercy"
"Yo, Micro Babe"
"MLK"
"She Comes"
"Wild"
"Dedicated to Glam"

Disc 2: The Time & Motion Mixes
"Melt Steel (Part 1)"
"Slow Motion"
"Kilimanjaro"
"Melt Steel (Part 2)"
"Blue Noise"
"The Great Southern Mix"
"Melt Steel (Part 3)"

"Melt Steel" contains segments of an interview with Marc Bolan.

Personnel
Credited to:
Cameron Allan – producer, mixing
Christina Amphlett – vocals
Jenny Andrews – vocals
Marc Bolan – interviewer, dialogue
Buckethead – guitar
Charles Clouser – producer, mixing
Iva Davies – producer, engineer, performer, mixing
808 State – remixing
Alan Fisch – engineer
Oz Fritz – engineer
Mark Gamble – producer, mixing
Ray Hearn – project supervisor
Jon Ingoldsby – guitar
Bill Laswell – bass, guitar (bass), producer, mixing, basic track
Simon Leadley – engineer, editing, mastering, mixing
Banula Marika – vocals, clapping sticks
Don Murray – didgeridoo
Steven Page – coordination
Bernie Worrell – keyboards
Yassa – rap 
All recording and mixing at General Dynamics, Trackdown Studios, Studios 301, FON Studios, Western Boulevarde.

References

Icehouse (band) albums
1994 remix albums